FC Sibir-2 Novosibirsk is a Russian football club, based in Novosibirsk. The club plays at the Spartak Stadium. It competed professionally in the Russian Second Division (East Zone) for a single season in 2008, taking 4th place. It previously played in the Amateur Football League.  It is a farm club of FC Sibir Novosibirsk. After 2008 season, it was dissolved and did not compete in 2009 or 2010. It was re-established in 2011 and entered the Russian Second Division once again. The club was dissolved again in the summer of 2016. Before the 2018–19 season, it was revived once again and reentered the third-tier Russian Professional Football League. At the end of the 2018–19 season, the parent club Sibir was relegated to PFL itself, therefore Sibir-2 will not be eligible to participate in the 2019–20 season of the competition.

Team name history
 2003–2005: FC Chkalovets-1936-2 Novosibirsk
 2006–2008, 2011–2016: FC Sibir-2 Novosibirsk

References

External links
Official website 

Association football clubs established in 2003
Football clubs in Russia
Sport in Novosibirsk
FC Sibir Novosibirsk
2003 establishments in Russia
Association football clubs disestablished in 2019
2019 disestablishments in Russia